Nová Ves is a municipality and village in Sokolov District in the Karlovy Vary Region of the Czech Republic. It has about 200 inhabitants.

Administrative parts
The village of Louka is an administrative part of Nová Ves.

References

Villages in Sokolov District